Eremophila debilis, the winter apple or amulla, is a flowering plant in the figwort family Scrophulariaceae, and is endemic to an area extending from north Queensland to near the border between New South Wales and Victoria in Australia. It is a prostrate shrub with elliptic to lance-shaped or egg-shaped leaves and white, rarely deep mauve flowers.

Description

The petal tube is white to pale mauve and, unlike many others in the genus, does not have spots. The petal tube and lobes are mostly glabrous on the outside but the inside of the tube is filled with soft hairs. The 4 stamens are fully enclosed within the tube.

Taxonomy and naming
The species was first formally described by Henry Cranke Andrews in 1802, who gave it the name Pogonia debilis. The description was published in The Botanist's Repository for New, and Rare Plants. Robert Brown changed the name to Myoporum debile in 1810 and in 1992 Robert Chinnock changed the name to Eremophila debilis. The specific epithet (debilis) is a Latin word meaning "weak" or "feeble", referring to the weak, creeping branches.

Distribution and habitat
Eremophila debilis is widespread in eastern Queensland and New South Wales in a wide range of soils and vegetation associations, often in box and white cypress communities, sometimes forming dense mats.  It has been recorded near Boosey in Victoria. It is also present in New Zealand, thought to be the result of naturalisation.

Use in horticulture
Winter apple is well known in horticulture, although often as Myoporum debile. It is suitable as a groundcover in many areas as long as the soil is reasonably well-drained. Its flowers, fruit and foliage are attractive features. It is frost hardy and in ideal conditions will layer. Propagation from seed is difficult but is easy from hardened cuttings of the present year's growth.

See also
Austromyrtus dulcis

References

Plants described in 1802
debilis
Flora of New South Wales
Flora of Queensland
Taxa named by Henry Charles Andrews